The 2021–22 season was the 122nd season in the history of Eintracht Frankfurt, a football club based in Frankfurt, Germany. In addition to the domestic league, Eintracht Frankfurt also participated in this season's editions of the domestic cup, the DFB-Pokal, and the UEFA Europa League. This was the 97th season for Frankfurt in the Deutsche Bank Park, located in Frankfurt, Hesse, Germany. The season covers a period from 1 July 2021 to 30 June 2022.

Players

Squad

Players out on loan

Transfers

In

Out

Friendly matches

Competitions

Overall record

Bundesliga

League table

Results summary

Results by round

Matches

DFB-Pokal

UEFA Europa League

Group stage

Knockout phase

Round of 16

Quarter-finals

Semi-finals

Final

Statistics

Appearances and goals

|-
! colspan=14 style=background:#dcdcdc; text-align:center| Goalkeepers

|-
! colspan=14 style=background:#dcdcdc; text-align:center| Defenders

|-
! colspan=14 style=background:#dcdcdc; text-align:center| Midfielders

|-
! colspan=14 style=background:#dcdcdc; text-align:center| Forwards

|-
! colspan=14 style=background:#dcdcdc; text-align:center| Players transferred out during the season

Goalscorers

Last updated: 18 May 2022

Clean sheets

Last updated: 18 May 2022

Disciplinary record

Last updated: 18 May 2022

References

External links
 Official English Eintracht website
 German archive site
 2021–22 Eintracht Frankfurt season at kicker.de 
 2021–22 Eintracht Frankfurt season at Fussballdaten.de 

Eintracht Frankfurt seasons
Eintracht Frankfurt
Eintracht Frankfurt
UEFA Europa League-winning seasons